Trinitat Vella is one of the seven neighborhoods in the Sant Andreu district of Barcelona, Catalonia (Spain).

Neighbourhoods of Barcelona
Sant Andreu